Letter to the Duke of Norfolk is a book written in 1875 by  St John Henry Newman. Consisting of about 150 pages, it was meant as a response to Protestant-Catholic polemics that had emerged in the era of the First Vatican Council. In the book, Newman comments on the injustice of Prime Minister William Ewart Gladstone's claim that Catholics have "no mental freedom". Newman states that  Catholics "do not deserve his injurious reproach that we are captives and slaves of the Pope".

The book is formally addressed to the Duke of Norfolk, whose family was among the most prominent recusants after the Protestant Reformation.

External links
Letter to the Duke of Norfolk

Books about Catholicism
1875 non-fiction books
1875 in Christianity
Works by John Henry Newman